George Moon (19 March 1909 – 17 December 1981) was an English stage, film and television actor.

During the late 1950s he appeared as Ginger Smart in the television series Shadow Squad and its sequel Skyport.

Moon's largest television role came in 1977 when he played Tipping the butler in the short lived television series Lord Tramp alongside Hugh Lloyd  and Joan Sims.

His daughter is the actress Georgina Moon.

Selected filmography
 Diggers (1931) - Joe Mulga
 A Co-respondent's Course (1931)
 Diggers in Blighty (1933) - Joe Mulga
 Lightning Conductor (1938) - George
 Me and My Pal (1939) - Hal Thommson
 Time Flies (1944) - Bill Barton
 What Do We Do Now? (1945) - Wesley - (with Leslie Fuller)
 An Alligator Named Daisy (1955) - Al
 It's a Wonderful World (1956) - Taxi Driver
 Carry on Admiral (1957) - Casey (uncredited)
 Davy (1958) - Jerry
 A Guy Called Caesar (1962) - Maurice
 The Boys (1962) - Mr. Champneys
 A Matter of Choice (1963) - Spike
 Breath of Life (1963) - Freddie
 Die, Monster, Die! (1965) - Taxi Driver (uncredited)
 Promise Her Anything (1965) - Neighbour
 Half a Sixpence (1967) - Pub Character
 Carry On Camping (1969) - Scrawny Man
 Carry On Dick (1974) - Mr. Giles
 Eskimo Nell (1975) - Nightwatchman
 Yesterday's Hero (1979) - Changing Room Attendant (uncredited)

References

External links

1909 births
1981 deaths
Male actors from London
English male stage actors
English male film actors
English male television actors
20th-century English male actors